Aryeh Tartakower (1897–1982) was a Polish-born Israeli political activist, historian and sociologist. He was the Director of the Department of Relief and Rehabilitation of the World Jewish Congress during World War II. He was the Chair of the Department of Sociology at the Hebrew University of Jerusalem, and the author of many books about Jewish refugees and Israel.

Early life
Aryeh Tartakower was born in 1897 in Brody, Eastern Galicia. He graduated from the University of Vienna.

Career
Tartakower was the founder and chairman of the Histadrut Zionist Labor Party in Poland from 1922 to 1939. He served on the city council of Lodz in 1938-1939.

Tartakower joined the World Zionist Actions Committee in 1927. He served as the Director of the Department of Relief and Rehabilitation and Deputy Director of the Institute of Jewish Affairs at the World Jewish Congress in New York City from 1939 to 1946. He served as the chairman of the World Jewish Congress's Israel organization from 1948 to 1971. In this capacity, he alerted U.S. government officials about the fascist past of Romanian emigrant Valerian Trifa in 1962. Tartakower subsequently served as the chair of its cultural department. He also joined the executive committee of the World Hebrew Confederation in 1959. By 1976, he served as the chair of the Falasha Relief Committee, where he helped Ethiopian Jews emigrate to Israel.

Tatakower taught sociology at the Institute of Jewish Sciences in Warsaw, Poland from 1932 to 1939. After he made aliyah in 1946, he served as the Chair of the Department of Sociology at the Hebrew University of Jerusalem. He was the author of many books in Polish, English, Yiddish and Hebrew.

Death
Tartakower died in 1982 in Jerusalem, Israel.

Works

References

1897 births
1982 deaths
University of Vienna alumni
Polish emigrants to Israel
Academic staff of the Hebrew University of Jerusalem
Israeli sociologists
20th-century Israeli historians